Since the 1990s, Belarus has been actively criticized by the United States, the European Union, the OSCE and the United Nations for human rights violations and electoral fraud. Various Belarusian officials, businesspeople with links to the authoritarian regime of Alexander Lukashenko and their companies have been subject to various sanctions involving asset freeze and travel bans.

US sanctions

Individuals

Political leadership, propaganda

Law enforcement

Judiciary

Businesspeople and their immediate relatives

Companies

Other

EU sanctions list following 2006 presidential elections

Senior state leadership

Election organization

State security services

Judiciary

EU sanctions list preceding the 2010 Presidential elections
The list of sanctioned individuals was consolidated on 25 October 2010. The presidential election was held on 19 December that year.

EU sanctions list following 23 September 2012 elections

This list of sanctioned individuals was published on 15 October 2012, following the 2012 Belarusian parliamentary election.

University rectors

State propaganda

Businesspeople

Judges and state prosecution

State security services

Remaining EU sanctions list after 2016

Sanctions after the disputed 2020 presidential election
After the disputed Belarusian presidential elections of 2020, several western countries announced sanctions against Belarusian officials. Latvia has been the first country to do so on 31 August, joined soon by Lithuania and Estonia. The list included President Lukashenko and all Central Election Committee members as well as other senior state official and security forces commanders.

The Baltic states were later followed by Canada, the United Kingdom, the United States, the European Union, Switzerland and New Zealand. These countries have sanctioned various numbers of Belarusian officials "for their roles in the fraudulent August 9, 2020 Belarus presidential election or the subsequent violent crackdown on peaceful protesters" or under similar motivations.

Timeline of the sanctions

Alexander Lukashenko and his family

Members of the Presidential Administration

Members of Elections Commissions

Judges

Constitutional Court of Belarus

Supreme Court of Belarus

Lower courts

Propaganda and information systems

Regional officials

Security Forces

KGB

Interior Ministry

Central apparatus

GUBOPiK

OMON

Regional police officials

Prosecutor’s Office

Investigative Committee

State Border Committee

Military

State Authority for Military Industry

State Control Committee

Prime Minister and his deputies

Other government officials

Members of the National Assembly of Belarus

Managers of the state-owned enterprises

Businesspeople

State university rectors

Others

Belarusian and Belarus-related entities

Government agencies

State−owned companies

Other notable entities

Sanctions following the 2022 Russian invasion of Ukraine

Circumvention of sanctions
In 2020 and 2021, Belarusian authorities made different efforts to circumvent the Western sanctions. They also hid the statistics to prevent revealing the ways used to circumvent them and track their effects. In particular, access to data regarding production and exports of the sanctioned goods became restricted to public. In October 2021, Belstat started to hide data regarding exports of tractors and trucks. Overall classified exports in January-August 2021 is estimated at USD 8.2 billion. In September 2021, Alexander Lukashenko mentioned minister of industry  and vice prime minister  as the people who organized the circumvention of sanctions. He also accused several workers of state factories of gathering information about the ways used to circumvent the sanctions, and he threatened them with imprisonment. 13 workers from Grodno Azot fertilizer factory, Naftan oil refinery, BMZ steel mill and Belarusian Railway were arrested by the Belarusian KGB in a possible connection with this statement. It was reported that some of them were accused of state treason. At least two of them were later released.

Shareholder structure of several companies was changed in order to take the subsidiary companies out from the restrictions. It was suggested that companies related to Lukashenko's deputy businessperson Mikalai Varabei were used to bypass the sanctions in the petroleum sector of industry. Polisch political scientist Piotr Żochowski suggested that the authorities will redirect their exports "through a chain of intermediaries in other countries", thus partially circumventing the sanctions.

Some Western companies helped Belarusian authorities to avoid sanctions or lobbied their lifting. In October 2021, director of the state-owned BMZ steel mill boasted that his factory wasn't sanctioned "due to certain actions taken by BMZ clients". In October 2021, Belgian authorities showed interest in easing of sanctions against Belarusian potash industry. It was later revealed that Belgian chemical company Tessenderlo Group lobbyied this initiative.

See also
 Censorship in Belarus
 Human rights in Belarus
 2010 Belarusian presidential election
 2006 Belarusian presidential election
 2004 Belarusian referendum
 1996 Belarusian referendum

Notes

References

International sanctions
Foreign relations of Belarus
Political history of Belarus
Belarus-related lists
2006 in international relations
2006 in Belarus
2011 in international relations
2011 in Belarus
2012 in international relations
2012 in Belarus
2020 in international relations
2020 in Belarus
2021 in international relations
2021 in Belarus